Pigeonberry ash is a common name for several flowering plants, in different families and orders from each other and from true ash trees, and may refer to:

Cryptocarya erythroxylon
Elaeocarpus kirtonii